Jefferson is a city in Marion County, Oregon, United States. It is part of the Salem Metropolitan Statistical Area. The population was 3,327 at the 2020 census.  It is home to the annual Mint Harvest Festival and is the self-proclaimed "Mint Capital of the World" as well as "Frog Jumping Capital of Oregon." The city sits on the right bank of the Santiam River between Salem and Albany along Oregon Route 164 east of Interstate 5.

History
The first name for this locality was Conser's Ferry, for Jacob S. Conser, an Oregon Trail pioneer of 1848 who ran a ferry across the Santiam River. He established the ferry in 1851, and also served as the postmaster of Santiam City. When the Jefferson Institute was established in the vicinity (not the same as the Jefferson Institute in Polk County), the name Jefferson was eventually adopted by the community. Jefferson post office was established in 1861, with a name change from Syracuse, and previously, Santiam City.

In 1974, the Jacob Conser House was listed on the National Register of Historic Places (NRHP), which served as the city's library until 2018. The current Oregon Route 164 bridge across the Santiam was designed by Conde McCullough and named in Conser's honor. The Jefferson Methodist Church was added to the NRHP in 1980. In 2017, voters recalled mayor Cyndie Hightower, and three city council members resigned over issues related to the annexation of land into the city.

Geography

Climate
This region experiences warm (but not hot) and dry summers, with no average monthly temperatures above .  According to the Köppen Climate Classification system, Jefferson has a warm-summer Mediterranean climate, abbreviated "Csb" on climate maps.

Demographics

2010 census
As of the census of 2010, there were 3,098 people, 1,057 households, and 820 families living in the city. The racial makeup of the city was 83.8% White, 0.2% African American, 1.7% Native American, 0.5% Asian, 0.3% Pacific Islander, 9.6% from other races, and 3.9% from two or more races. Hispanic or Latino of any race were 19.2% of the population.

There were 1,057 households, of which 44.3% had children under the age of 18 living with them, 59.5% were married couples living together, 13.3% had a female householder with no husband present, 4.7% had a male householder with no wife present, and 22.4% were non-families. 16.0% of all households were made up of individuals, and 6.7% had someone living alone who was 65 years of age or older. The average household size was 2.93 and the average family size was 3.27.

The median age in the city was 32 years. 30.5% of residents were under the age of 18; 8.1% were between the ages of 18 and 24; 29.3% were from 25 to 44; 22.8% were from 45 to 64; and 9.4% were 65 years of age or older. The gender makeup of the city was 48.7% male and 51.3% female.

2000 census
As of the census of 2000, there were 2,487 people, 817 households, and 643 families living in the city. The population density was 3,389.3 people per square mile (1,315.4/km2). There were 885 housing units at an average density of 1,206.1 per square mile (468.1/km2). The racial makeup of the city was 81.83% White, 0.36% African American, 1.89% Native American, 0.76% Asian, 0.04% Pacific Islander, 11.66% from other races, and 3.46% from two or more races. Hispanic or Latino of any race were 20.67% of the population.

There were 817 households, out of which 48.1% had children under the age of 18 living with them, 58.6% were married couples living together, 15.1% had a female householder with no husband present, and 21.2% were non-families. 16.4% of all households were made up of individuals, and 5.9% had someone living alone who was 65 years of age or older. The average household size was 3.04 and the average family size was 3.34.

In the city, the population was spread out, with 34.2% under the age of 18, 8.4% from 18 to 24, 30.4% from 25 to 44, 19.8% from 45 to 64, and 7.2% who were 65 years of age or older. The median age was 30 years. For every 100 females, there were 99.0 males. For every 100 females age 18 and over, there were 97.7 males.

The median income for a household in the city was $40,938, and the median income for a family was $42,647. Males had a median income of $31,196 versus $25,417 for females. The per capita income for the city was $15,426. About 12.2% of families and 16.2% of the population were below the poverty line, including 19.6% of those under age 18 and 4.2% of those age 65 or over.

Government
Jefferson uses a city council composed of six councilors and the mayor. As of March 2020, the current mayor of Jefferson is Michael Myers.

Education
Public education in the city is provided by the Jefferson School District, which includes three schools: Jefferson Elementary School, Jefferson Middle School, and Jefferson High School.

A new Middle School was built in 2019. The school is located right beside the Jefferson High School.

Notable people
Jeff Gilmour, politician
Carol Menken-Schaudt, Olympic basketball player
Frederick Steiwer, politician

References

External links
 Entry for Jefferson in the Oregon Blue Book

Cities in Oregon
Cities in Marion County, Oregon
Salem, Oregon metropolitan area
1870 establishments in Oregon
Populated places established in 1870
Jefferson